Vito Leonetti (born 16 March 1994) is an Italian footballer who plays as a forward for  club Turris.

Club career
Leonetti finished his youth formation at Bari, and was subsequently loaned to lowly Olympia Agnonese. After scoring nine goals with the side in Serie D, he returned to Biancorossi and made his professional debut on 8 September coming on as a second-half substitute in a 2–3 loss at Siena.

On 29 June 2021, he signed a two-year contract with Turris.

References

External links

1994 births
Living people
Association football forwards
Italian footballers
Serie B players
Serie C players
Serie D players
S.S.C. Bari players
A.C. Savoia 1908 players
S.S. Akragas Città dei Templi players
F.C. Lumezzane V.G.Z. A.S.D. players
Reggina 1914 players
Vastese Calcio 1902 players